Voltarrosto  is a frazione of the comune of Roseto degli Abruzzi (Province of Teramo) in the Abruzzo region of Italy.

Voltarrosto is a village just to the west of Roseto in the Abruzzo region of central Italy.  It faces south and the vegetation in the area is lush.  Towards the end of July a festival called the “Roseto West Fest” is held in Voltarrosto that includes music and entertainment.1

The Church of Sant' Anna is located within Voltarrosto.

References

Frazioni of the Province of Teramo